Ernesto Sabato (June 24, 1911 – April 30, 2011) was an Argentine novelist, essayist, painter and physicist. According to the BBC he "won some of the most prestigious prizes in Hispanic literature" and "became very influential in the literary world throughout Latin America". Upon his death El País dubbed him the "last classic writer in Argentine literature".

Sabato was distinguished by his bald pate and brush moustache and wore tinted spectacles and open-necked shirts. He was born in Rojas, a small town in Buenos Aires Province. Sabato began his studies at the Colegio Nacional de La Plata. He then studied physics at the Universidad Nacional de La Plata, where he earned a PhD. He then attended the Sorbonne in Paris and worked at the Curie Institute. After World War II, he lost interest in science and started writing.

Sabato's oeuvre includes three novels: El Túnel (1948), Sobre héroes y tumbas (1961) and Abaddón el exterminador (1974). The first of these received critical acclaim upon its publication from, among others, fellow writers Albert Camus and Thomas Mann. The second is regarded as his masterpiece, though he nearly burnt it like many of his other works. Sabato's essays cover topics as diverse as metaphysics, politics and tango. His writings led him to receive many international prizes, including the Miguel de Cervantes Prize (Spain), the Legion of Honour (France), the Jerusalem Prize (Israel), and the Prix du Meilleur Livre Étranger (France).

At the request of President Raúl Alfonsín, he presided over the CONADEP Commission that investigated the fate of those who suffered forced disappearance during the Dirty War of the 1970s. The result of these findings was published in 1984, bearing the title Nunca Más (Never Again).

Biography

Early years 
Ernesto Sabato was born in Rojas, Buenos Aires Province, son of Francesco Sabato and Giovanna Maria Ferrari, Italian immigrants from Calabria. His father was from Fuscaldo, and his mother was an Arbëreshë (Albanian minority in Italy) from San Martino di Finita. He was the tenth of a total of 11 children. Being born after his ninth brother's death, he carried on his name "Ernesto".

In 1924 he finished primary school in Rojas and settled in the city of La Plata for his secondary education at the Colegio Nacional de La Plata. There he met professor Pedro Henríquez Ureña, an early inspiration for his writing career. In 1929 he started college, attending the School of Physics and Mathematics at the Universidad Nacional de La Plata.

He was an active member in the Reforma Universitaria movement, founding "Insurrexit Group" in 1933 – of communist ideals – together with Héctor P. Agosti, Ángel Hurtado de Mendoza and Paulino González Alberdi, among others.

In 1933 he was elected Secretario General of the Federación Juvenil Comunista (Communist Youth Federation). While attending a lecture about Marxism he met Matilde Kusminsky Richter, aged 17, who would leave her parents' house to live with Sabato.

In 1934 he started to doubt Communism and Joseph Stalin's regime. The Communist Party of Argentina, which had noted this, sent him to the International Lenin School for two years. According to Sabato, "it was a place where either you recovered or ended up in a gulag or psychiatric hospital". Before arriving at Moscow, he traveled to Brussels as a delegate from the Communist Party of Argentina at the "Congress against Fascism and the War". Once there, fearing not coming back from Moscow, he left the congress to escape to Paris. It was there where he wrote his first novel: La Fuente Muda, which remains unpublished. Once back in Buenos Aires, in 1936, he married Matilde Kusminsky Richter.

His years as a scientist 
In 1938 he obtained his PhD in physics from the Universidad Nacional de La Plata. Thanks to Bernardo Houssay, he was granted a research fellowship in atomic radiation at the Curie Institute in Paris. On May 25, 1938 Jorge Federico Sabato, his first son, was born. While in France he made contact with the surrealist movement, studying the works of Oscar Domínguez, Benjamin Péret, Roberto Matta Echaurren and Esteban Francés among others. This would have a deep influence on his future writing.

In 1939 he transferred to the Massachusetts Institute of Technology . Once in 1940 he came back to Argentina intent on leaving physics behind. However, serving an obligation to those responsible for his fellowship Sabato started teaching at the Universidad de La Plata for Engineering admission, and relativity and quantum mechanics for post graduate degrees. In 1943, due to an "existential crisis", he left science for good to become a full-time writer and painter.

In 1945, his second son, Mario Sabato was born.

Writing career 

In 1941, Sabato published his first literary work, an article about La invención de Morel by Adolfo Bioy Casares, in the magazine Teseo from La Plata. Also, in concert with Pedro Henríquez Ureña, he published a collaboration in the renowned Sur magazine.

In 1942, working for Sur magazine reviewing books, he was put in charge of the "Calendario" section and participated in "Desagravio a Borges" in Sur nº 94. He also published articles in La Nación and a translation of The Birth and Death of the Sun by George Gamow. The following year he published a translation of The ABC of Relativity by Bertrand Russell.

In 1945, his first book, Uno y el Universo, a series of essays criticizing the apparent moral neutrality of science and warning about dehumanization processes in technological societies, was published; with time he would turn towards a libertarian and humanist standing. That same year he was awarded a prize by the municipality of Buenos Aires for his book and the honor wand of the Sociedad Argentina de Escritores.

In 1948, after being rejected by several Buenos Aires editors, Sabato published in Sur his first novel, El túnel, a psychological novel narrated in the first person. Framed in existentialism, it was met with enthusiastic reviews by Albert Camus, who had Gallimard publish a French translation. It has been further translated to more than 10 languages. Others who enjoyed the book included Thomas Mann.

France's literary industry named Sabato's book Abaddon, el Exterminador (The Angel of Darkness) the best foreign book of 1976.

In 1998 Sabato's wife died.
In 1999 he acquired Italian citizenship in addition to his original Argentine nationality.

Sabato died in Santos Lugares on April 30, 2011, two months short of his 100th birthday. His death was the result of bronchitis, according to his companion and collaborator Elvira González Fraga.  The Spanish newspaper El Mundo said he had been "the last surviving Argentine writer with a capital W".

Works

Novels 
 1948: El túnel (Translated by Harriet de Onis in 1950 as The Outsider and again by Margaret Sayers Peden in 1988 as The Tunnel)
 1961: Sobre héroes y tumbas (Translated by Helen R. Lane in 1981 as On Heroes and Tombs)
 1974: Abaddón el exterminador (Translated by Andrew Hurley in 1991 as The Angel of Darkness)

Essays 
 1945: Uno y el Universo (One and the Universe)
 1951: Hombres y engranajes (Man and Mechanism)
 1953: Heterodoxia (Heterodoxy)
 1956: El caso Sabato. Torturas y libertad de prensa. Carta abierta al General Aramburu (The Sabato Case. Tortures and Liberty of Press. Open Letter to General Aramburu)
 1956: El otro rostro del peronismo (The Other Face of Peronism)
 1963: El escritor y sus fantasmas (Translated by Asa Zatz in 1990 as The Writer in the Catastrophe of our Time.)
 1963: Tango, discusión y clave (Tango: Discussion and Key)
 1967: Significado de Pedro Henríquez Ureña (Significance of Pedro Henríquez Ureña)
 1968: Tres aproximaciones a la literatura de nuestro tiempo: Robbe-Grillet, Borges, Sartre (Three Approximations to the Literature of our Time: Robbe-Grillet, Borges, Sartre)
 1973: La cultura en la encrucijada nacional (Culture in the National Crossroads)
 1976: Diálogos con Jorge Luis Borges (Dialogues with Jorge Luis Borges) (Edited by Orlando Barone)
 1979: Apologías y rechazos (Apologies and Rebuttals)
 1979: Los libros y su misión en la liberación e integración de la América Latina (Books and their Mission in the Liberation and Integration of Latin America)
 1988: Entre la letra y la sangre. Conversaciones con Carlos Catania (Between Letter and Blood. Conversations with Carlos Catania)
 1998: Antes del fin (Before the End)
Antes del fin is an autobiography in which he recounts his life and the influences on his political and ethical opinions. Sabato discusses the ill effects of globalization and the exalting of rationalism and materialism. There are also several tender passages about his school experiences in the 1920s (when there was more idealism, Sabato says), about his deceased wife and son, Matilde and Jorge, and about the struggling workers he meets on the streets of Buenos Aires.
 2000: La resistencia (The Resistance)
 2004: España en los diarios de mi vejez (Spain in the Diaries of my Old Age)

Others 
 1964: Itinerario (Itinerary)
 1966: Romance de la muerte de Juan Lavalle. Cantar de Gesta (Romance of Juan Lavalle's Death. Cantar de gesta)
 1984: Nunca más. Informe de la Comisión Nacional sobre la desaparición de personas (Never Again. Report from the National Commission on the Disappearance of Persons)

Tribute 
On 24 June 2019, on Sábato's 108th birthday, he was honored with a Google Doodle.

See also 

Argentine literature

References

Further reading 
 Bacarisse, Salvador (1980). Abaddón el Exterminador: Sábato's Gnostic Eschatology, in Contemporary Latin American Fiction, Scottish Academic Press, Edinburgh 1980  (pp. 88–109).
  Bacarisse, Salvador (1983). Poncho celeste, banda punzó: la dualidad histórica argentina. Una interpretación de Sobre héroes y tumbas de Ernesto Sábato in Cuadernos Hispanoamericanos, Madrid Enero-Marzo 1983 Números 391 393.
 Conde, David (1981). Archetypal Patterns in Ernesto Sabato's Sobre héroes y tumbas.
 Foster, David William (1975). Currents in the Contemporary Argentine Novel: Arlt, Mallea, Sabato, and Cortázar.
 Francis, Nathan Travis (1973). Ernesto Sabato as a Literary Critic.
 Oberhelman, Harley D. (1970). Ernesto Sabato.
 Petersen, John Fred (1963). Ernesto Sabato: Essayist and Novelist.
 Predmore, James R. (1977). A Critical Study of the Novels of Ernesto Sabato.
 Price Munn, Nancy Elaine (1975). Ernesto Sabato: Theory and Practice of the Novel, 1945–1973.
  Wainerman Gonilsky, Luis (1978 [1971]). Sábato y el misterio de los ciegos.

External links 

Interview with Ernesto Sábato: a sense of wonder, The UNESCO Courier, August 1990

translation Man and Mechanism
translation The Resistance

1911 births
2011 deaths
People from Rojas Partido
Argentine physicists
Argentine people of Italian descent
Argentine people of Arbëreshë descent
Argentine people of Calabrian descent
Premio Cervantes winners
National University of La Plata alumni
University of Paris alumni
International Lenin School alumni
Jerusalem Prize recipients
Psychological fiction writers
20th-century Argentine novelists
20th-century Argentine male writers